Nine West Holdings (formerly The Jones Group and Jones Apparel Group) is an American designer, marketer and wholesaler of branded clothing, shoes and accessories. In 2019, the company restructured under the new name Premier Brands Group Holdings Llc.

Operations

History 

In December 2013, Sycamore Partners, which is managed by Stefan L. Kaluzny, purchased the Jones Group for about US$2.2 billion. Wesley Card is the CEO of The Jones Group. In 2014, Sycamore split Jones into six different companies: Nine West Group, One Jeanswear Group, Jones New York, the Kasper Group, Stuart Weitzman and Kurt Geiger. The Jones Group was renamed Nine West Holdings and became parent to Nine West Group and One Jeanswear Group. Later in 2014, Anne Klein, Easy Spirit and NW Jewelry Group were split into separate operating companies of Nine West.

In 2014, Brian Atwood was sold to Steve Madden. In 2015, Stuart Weitzman was sold to Coach and Jones New York was sold to Authentic Brands Group.

In December 2016, Easy Spirit was sold to Marc Fisher Footwear. The Kasper Group was then purchased and incorporated under the parent company Nine West Holdings in January 2017. In January 2017, the company appointed Joel Oblonsky as the CEO of the company.

Bankruptcy
Nine West Holdings filed for chapter 11 bankruptcy in April 2018. In July 2018, the namesake Nine West brand, as well as the Bandolino shoe brand, were sold to Authentic Brands Group. Bondholders have accused Sycamore Partners, the private equity firm that purchased Nine West Holdings in 2014, of carving out valuable company assets to sell to itself, thus ensuring a profit for the fund even as the company itself headed toward bankruptcy, and argue that the company could be hurt if Sycamore-owned department store chain Belk threatens to refuse to buy from the company if the bankruptcy settlement isn't approved.

The company emerged from bankruptcy in March 2019 and renamed itself Premier Brands Group. Divisions include One Jeanswear Group, The Jewelry Group, Kasper Group and Anne Klein.

Brands

Nine West Holdings' brands include:

Anne Klein
 Bandolino (sold to Authentic Brands Group in 2018)
Nine West (sold to Authentic Brands Group in 2018)
Enzo Angiolini
Circa Joan & David
The Jewelry Group (Formerly NW Jewelry)
Givenchy Jewelry
Judith Jack
Napier
ONE Jeanswear Group
Energie
Gloria Vanderbilt
GLO Jeans
Jessica Simpson Jeanswear
l.e.i.
Bandolino
The Kasper Group
Albert Nipon
Anne Klein
Evan Picone
Kasper
Le Suit
Nine West
Martha Stewart
Daisy Fuentes
Skinny Girl

References

External links
 Former official websites
 
 

Clothing companies of the United States
Clothing companies based in New York City
Holding companies based in New York City
American companies established in 1970
Clothing companies established in 1970
Conglomerate companies established in 1970
Holding companies established in 1970
1970 establishments in New York (state)
Companies formerly listed on the New York Stock Exchange
2013 mergers and acquisitions
Companies that filed for Chapter 11 bankruptcy in 2018